Rabdophaga exsiccans is a gall midge. It was first described by Ewald Heinrich Rübsaamen in 1916. The larvae tunnel in the shoots of  creeping willow (Salix repens) and may cause the shoots to swell slightly.

Description
The orange or red larvae live under the bark of shoots. Before the larvae pupate they make emergence holes which may be the only indication of their presence. Shoots with larvae die off.

References

exsiccans
Nematoceran flies of Europe
Gall-inducing insects
Insects described in 1916
Taxa named by Ewald Heinrich Rübsaamen
Willow galls